Megas is the first album by Icelandic rock singer Magnús Þór Jónsson (better known as Megas).

The original album released in 1972 has 15 songs and was released on CD in 1994. The 2002 remastered reissue has seven bonus tracks, demos and live recordings. Most of the bonus tracks have not been released on any other album. “Pældu í því (sem pælandi er í)” is a variation of “Spáðu í mig” with a slightly different melody and a different lyric, but the same theme. A new version of the song “Adieu Capital” reappeared in 2005 on an album jointly released by Megas and Súkkat titled Hús Datt.

Track listing

Track note:
Two different versions of “Skutullinn” are featured here.

External links
Page about Megas at Tónlist.com
Official site of Guðlaugur Kristinn Óttarsson
GKÓ at MySpace.com
Page of Þorsteinn Magnússon at MySpace.com

Megas albums
1972 albums